Budislav may refer to:

Budislav (Svitavy District), a village in the Pardubice Region, Czech Republic
Budislav (Tábor District), a village in the South Bohemian Region, Czech Republic
Budislav (given name), Slavic masculine given name